Exonumia are numismatic items (such as tokens, medals, or scrip) other than coins and paper money. This includes "Good For" tokens, badges, counterstamped coins, elongated coins, encased coins, souvenir medallions, tags, wooden nickels and other similar items.  It is an aspect of numismatics and many coin collectors are also exonumists.

Besides the above strict definition, others extend it to include non-coins which may or may not be legal tenders such as cheques, credit cards and similar paper.  These can also be considered notaphily or scripophily.

Etymology
The noun exonumia is derived from two classical roots: exo, meaning "out-of" in Greek, and nummus, meaning "coin" in Latin (from Greek νοῦμμος – noummos, "coin"); thus, "out[side]-of-[the category]coins". The equivalent British term, paranumismatica, may also be used.

The words exonumist and exonumia were coined in July 1960 by Russell Rulau, a recognized authority and author on the subject, and accepted by Webster's dictionary in 1965.

Token Coins

Many tokens were produced and used as currency in the United States and elsewhere when there was a shortage of government-issued money. Tokens have been used for both to advertise and to facilitate commerce. 

Token authority Russell Rulau offers a broad definition for exonumia, and lines between categories can be fuzzy. For example, an advertising token may also be considered a medal. Good For tokens may also advertise. Counter-stamped coins have been called "little billboards." Exonumia may include anything coin-like that is not a government-issued coin. 

The English term "para-numismatica", or alongside currency, appears more limiting, hinting that tokens must have some sort of “value” or monetary usage. One definition of para-numismatica is anything coin-like but not a coin. In America this is not the accepted usage. Rulau's 1040 page tome, UNITED STATES TOKENS: 1700–1900  includes many tokens without any monetary value depicted on the token. While he included many items, the book is not exhaustive.

The following groupings of categories are continually expanding. One way of parsing tokens is into these three general categories:
 Has a "value," facilitating commerce, such as Good for (something).
 Commemoration, remembrance, dedication, or the like, for some person, place, idea or event.
 Of a personal nature.

Typically, catalogs of tokens are organized by location, time period, and/or type of item. Historically, the need for tokens grew out of the need for currency. In America, some tokens legally circulated alongside or instead of currency up until recently. Hard Times Tokens and Civil War Tokens each were the size of the contemporary cent. Afterwards, value based items, such as Good for (amount of money), Good for One Quart of Milk, Good for One Beer, Good for One Ride… and others were specifically linked to commerce of the store or place of issue.

For clarity, exonumia are numismatic items, other than government coins or paper money, which can be studied or collected.

Numismatic = coins, paper money, exonumia (numismatist)
Exonumia = tokens, medals, badges, ribbons, etc. (exonumist) 
Notaphily = paper money (notaphile/notaphiliac).
Scripophily = stock certificates (scripophilist, scripophilac)

Medals

Medals are coin-like artistic objects, typically with a commemorative purpose. They may be awarded for recognition of achievement or created for sale to commemorate individuals or events. They may be souvenirs, devotional, or purely artistic. Medals are generally not used as currency or for exchange.

Exonumia Collecting

Exonumia collectors, like coin collectors, are attentive to condition and rarity, as well as to history, form and type. Exonumists may collect items by region, topic, type, shape or material. These different collecting preferences may change the ways tokens are documented, i.e., by region, time period, or type.

The following categories are typical. This is not all-inclusive but is a sampling of the wide variety of exonumia:

Modified/Augmented:
Love Token: A coin with hand engraving, generally on one side, or deliberately bent.
Carved Potty coins: usually United States Seated Liberty coinage carved to show lady Liberty sitting on a chamber pot.

Hobo nickels: Initially, hand-engraved Buffalo nickels mostly in the era 1913–38.  Now, applied more generally to hand-engraved coins of different denominations.
Counterstamped/countermarked or chopped coins (done by merchants or governments)
Cut Coins: Coins that are artistically carved creations made from genuine coins, both new and old, often for jewelry.
Elongated coins: Rolled out with advertising, commemorative, or souvenir designs on one side
Encased Coin: Generally in a ring with advertising
Encased Postage: Actual postage stamps mounted into a round frame with advertising on the other side
 Colored or painted circulation or bullion issues

Play-Game money / Arcade Amusement / Novelty
Arcade tokens
Amusement
Game Counter
Play money
Novelty money
Peep show
Casino/Slot tokens/Casino chips
Geocoins used in geocaching
Mardi Gras Doubloons

Government Services & Non-National tools to Facilitate Commerce
Car wash tokens
 Jetons: Used as counters when verifying totals or weights of coins for commerce and exchange
 Telephone tokens
 Evasion tokens: 18th century semi-counterfeit were made to look like kind of but not exactly like actual currency
 Local currency, e.g. Ithaca Hours

 Sales tax tokens: Issued by states and merchants
 Parking tokens: for meters or gates
 Dog license tags
 Post office tags
 Food stamps
 Slave tags – slave hire badges (Tax Receipts)

Transportation Tokens
 Ferries and watercraft
 Buses
 Subway
 Trains
 Trams/Trolleys

Closed Community / Membership
 Company scrip
 Ingle Credit System script
 Lumber
 Mining
 Plantation
 Civilian Conservation Corps (CCC) 
 College Currency
 Military Challenge
 Military Store and Entertainment
 Picker tokens for crops
 Prison and Correctional/Asylums
 Leper colony money
 Fraternal
 Masonic
 Elks
 Moose
 Eagles
 Woodmen of the World

 Communion tokens (given to congregation members in good standing to permit them to participate in Holy Communion)

Unique material / shapes
 Wooden nickels
 Cardboard or paper
 Hard rubber or vulcanite
 Advertising pocket mirrors

Movements and ideals
 Temperance
 Anti-slavery
 Religious (including temple tokens)
 Political campaign tokens
 World's Fair (Expositions around the world)
 Locations
 City or state anniversary

Of a Personal nature – Personals
 Key tags (e.g. In case lost return to …)
 Badges
 Company
 Occupation
 Hand-engraved or uniquely counterstamped coins, as pocket pieces
 Watch fobs

By Issuer
 Milk/dairy
 Bakery token
 Beer
 Pub/bar/saloon
 Billiards/pool
 Cigar/smoke shops
 Brothel tokens
 Disney Dollars
 Fisherman tokens
 Railway cheque tokens
 Restroom tokens for pay toilet use
 Coat check
 Doctors (including apothecary tokens) 
 Automobiles

Medals
 George Washington medals
 Presidents, governors, other politicians
 Inventors and other important persons

Modern items under the exonumia umbrella include:
 Credit cards
 Gift cards: Gift cards have been replacing the giving of cash for events
 Telephone cards
 Music cards

Rulau in his 1700–1900 book historically breaks down American tokens into these general time periods:
 Early American
 Hard times tokens were made during the "hard times" after President Andrew Jackson shut down the Second Bank of the United States. These also were issued privately to circulate in the local economy as a one cent coin. They had a wide variety of subject matter, anti-slavery, anti-Jackson
 Merchant (including modern gas tokens, ex: Shell tokens)
 American Civil War
 Trade tokens
 Gay 90s

Other forms in Latin America

Another important area of token collecting is Latin American coffee or plantation tokens. Many but not all of these tokens were made in the United States while others were made in Europe and England. These tokens are circulated in more than one language although Spanish is the prevalent one. Plantation tokens can have an array of denominations and names. The name can be the owner or their relatives. Sometimes the token can have the name of the farm (or finca). Lastly, tokens had allegorical symbols to identify the owner. Very little documentation exists since the inception of Latin American tokens, therefore, many tokens cannot be verified as to who the real owner is or what the symbol or symbols meant.

Tokens in Latin America were used as currency since there was not enough official currency available. Customarily, workers could convert the tokens to official currency on Saturdays. It is widely understood that many plantation owners in Latin America had their own commissaries, therefore, the workers were able to use the farm owners tokens to pay for provisions. It is important to note that in the 19th century many of the plantation workers and families lived in the farm they worked on.

Latin American tokens were made in all types of base metals and alloys plus plastic, celluloid and bakelite. Unique to Costa Rica were tokens made in paper fashion, either uniface or printed on both sides. Many people call these paper chits. The word "Boleto" is used solely in Costa Rica for the word token whereas "ficha" is used in the rest of Latin America.

See also

 Coin
 Currency
 Numismatics
 Token coins
 Scrip
 Paraphilately

References

Further reading
 Coin-Gallery.com glossary
 PlantageGeld, Plantation tokens, mainly Netherlands East Indies (Sumatra and Java), British North Borneo and Ceylon
 24carat.co.UK Numismatic jargon – Coin terms
 Chicago Coin Club Reference
 Canadiancoin.com, dictionary
 Australianstamp.com – Glossary of Numismatic terms
 CostaRicaTokens.com – Costa Rica Tokens
 Token Tales, an educational website on trade tokens
 Médailles Jeanne d’Arc, French site containing pictures and descriptions of Medallions devoted to Joan of Arc
 Latin American Tokens: An Illustrated, Priced Catalog of the Unofficial Coinage of Latin America—Used in Plantation, Mine, Mill, and Dock—From 1700 to the 20th Century by Russell Rulau

External links

 Token And Medal Society
 Civil War Token Society
Richard's Token Database Searchable database for Good For's and other items